Actinopus itapitocai is a species of mygalomorph spider in the family Actinopodidae. It can be found in Brazil.

The specific name itapitocai refers to the municipality of Itapitanga, Brazil.

References 

Spiders described in 2020
itapitocai
Spiders of Brazil